Qira may refer to:

Qira County, county in Hotan, Xinjiang, China
Qira, Haifa, a depopulated village of Palestine
Qira, Salfit, a Palestinian village in the West Bank
Qi'ra, a fictional character in the Star Wars franchise